Hokkaido Otaru Choryo High School (北海道小樽潮陵高等学校, Hokkaidō Otaru Chōryō Kōtō Gakkō) is a high school in Otaru, Hokkaidō, Japan, founded in 1902. Hokkaido Otaru Choryo High School is one of high schools administrated by Hokkaido.

The school is operated by the Hokkaido Prefectural Board of Education.

Notable alumni
Masaki Kobayashi (小林 正樹) Film director
Sei Itō (伊藤 整) Poet, novelist, and translator
Emi Okazaki (岡崎 英美) Musician, and the keyboardist of Sakanaction 
Hiroshi Yoshizawa (吉沢 広司) Ski jumper
Koji Kato (加藤 浩次) News caster and comedian

External links
The Official Website of Hokkaido Otaru Choryo High School

High schools in Hokkaido
Educational institutions established in 1902
1902 establishments in Japan